Andeg is a village in Zapolyarny District, Nenets Autonomous Okrug, Russia. It had a population of 175 as of 2010, a decrease from its population of 215 in 2002.

References

Rural localities in Nenets Autonomous Okrug